Home for the Holidays is a Christmas album by Country music singer Lynn Anderson, released in 1999.

Anderson had previously released a Christmas album in 1971, simply titled The Christmas Album. Home for the Holidays consists of some re-recorded versions of the songs featured in that previous Christmas album plus new tracks, such as "Santa Baby" and "Angels Song". The album was not a commercial success. The album includes cover versions of holiday hits from the 1940s onward, such as Bing Crosby's "White Christmas", Nat King Cole's "The Christmas Song", and Bobby Helms' "Jingle Bell Rock".

Track listing
"Jingle Bell Rock" – 2:23
"Have Yourself a Merry Little Christmas" – 3:58
"White Christmas" – 3:17
"I Saw Mommy Kissing Santa Claus" – 2:33
"I'll Be Home for Christmas" – 2:44
"Winter Wonderland" – 2:25
"Jingle Bells" – 1:52
"Home for the Holidays" – 3:09
"Santa Baby" – 3:25
"Silver Bells" – 3:44
"The Christmas Song" – 3:23
"Angels Song" – 3:20

Lynn Anderson albums
1999 Christmas albums
Christmas albums by American artists
Country Christmas albums